Snuka is a surname. Notable people with the surname include:

Snuka Boy (born 1974), Japanese professional wrestler, known as Gentaro
Jimmy Snuka, Jr. (born 1971), American professional wrestler
Jimmy Snuka (1943–2017), Fijian professional wrestler and actor
Tamina Snuka (born 1978), American professional wrestler and actress
Terry Snuka (born 1964), American professional wrestler, known as Sabu

See also
Soonuka
Suka (disambiguation)